Talamarla is a village in Anantapur district of the Indian state of Andhra Pradesh. It is located in Kothacheruvu mandal of Kadiri Revenue Division.

References 

Villages in Anantapur district